Synanthedon vespiformis, the yellow-legged clearwing, is a moth of the family Sesiidae. It is found in the Palearctic realm.

The wingspan is 18–20 mm. The moth flies from April to September depending on the location.

The larvae feed on oak, but also species from the genera Populus, Aesculus and Salix.

References

External links
Yellow-legged clearwing at UKmoths

Sesiidae
Moths described in 1761
Taxa named by Carl Linnaeus
Moths of Europe